The 2013–14 season was Port Vale's 102nd season of football in the English Football League, and first season back in League One, following their promotion from League Two. Avoiding relegation was the aim set in pre-season, as the club had one of the lowest six budgets in the division.

The club enjoyed kind draws and a good run in the FA Cup, reaching the Fourth Round, where they were knocked out by Brighton & Hove Albion. They exited the League Cup at the first Round, with Walsall the victors. They reached the Second Round of the League Trophy, losing out to Rochdale. The club overstretched itself financially, meaning that as they lay outside the play-offs in January manager Micky Adams could only sign largely untried youngsters on loan whilst releasing higher paid players either on free transfers or on loan. Their promotion push fell away but they ended the season in ninth place – far exceeding their original aim.

Despite steady progress on the pitch, avoidable issues off the pitch continued to plague the club. Micky Adams was not offered a new contract until right at the end of the season, meaning that the season ended with the manager and most of the playing staff out of contract. The club also hit the headlines in April after Daniel Jones was sacked for attacking captain Doug Loft during a training ground session.

Overview

League One
Manager Micky Adams' first signing of the season was winger Kaid Mohamed, who stepped up to League One from League Two play-off semi-finalists Cheltenham Town; he was seen as a replacement for departing left-winger Ashley Vincent. Also joining the club were Preston North End defender Chris Robertson, Southend United forward Gavin Tomlin, and Sheffield Wednesday central midfielder Chris Lines. Liam Dickinson joined the Vale on trial for the second summer in a row, and again left without a contract after failing to prove his fitness. Adams, known for his gruelingly tough pre-season workouts, did not disappoint and left his players exhausted following their trip to Ireland. Following the trip, Anthony Griffith re-joined the club after securing his exit from League One rivals Leyton Orient. Mathias Kouo-Doumbé, Paul Reid and Ben Parker joined the club on trial, as Vale desperately needed more defensive cover. However the sixth signing of the summer was revealed as former Stoke City left-back Carl Dickinson, who secured his release form Watford in order to join the Vale. Chairman Norman Smurthwaite then told fans that there were to be no new signings as the club's wage bill was now up to 60 per cent of turnover – the maximum allowed under the Football League's new Financial Fair Play rule.

Vale opened the season with a credible 1–1 draw at home to Brentford; the "Bees" were tipped to gain promotion after losing last season's play-off final, but failed to make the most of the numerous chances they created at Vale Park. Vale then travelled away from home with a defensive mindset and narrowly lost 1–0 at Colchester United. Adams admitted that he picked the wrong side and formation, and that his players also seemed to lack "enthusiasm" in the game. He made changes to his team and tactics – reverting to 4–4–2 – for the visit of newly promoted Bradford City, and Vale secured a deserved 2–1 victory. The win was however marred by racist chanting by a small section of supporters on the Railway Paddock; the club was later given a warning by the FA for the incident. Vale then travelled to Oldham Athletic and were well beaten 3–1 after Lee Hughes missed a 37th-minute penalty when the scores were level at 1–1. They ended the month with another defeat, as Wolverhampton Wanderers left Burslem with a 3–1 win, the one positive being Tom Pope getting off the mark with a last minute consolation. Further crowd problems emerged as 23 fans were arrested after violence erupted after the game.

Pope continued his scoring run, as an injury time goal earned the Vale a 1–0 win at struggling Carlisle United. This proved to be the last match for "Cumbrians" boss Greg Abbott, who was sacked two days later. Vale then were beaten 3–2 by Leyton Orient, who recorded their sixth successive league victory. Despite the result, fans were pleased with the team's performance against the league leaders. Another tough match followed with Coventry City, and supporters were treated to an entertaining game that saw the Valiants twice come from behind to record a 3–2 victory. Immediately following the game Rob Page was put in temporary charge of first team affairs at Vale Park after Adams took the decision to take time off work to have hip replacement surgery. His first game in charge was a 1–0 victory at Tranmere Rovers, with Chris Lines' well taken free-kick being enough to win the three points. Page also took charge of the 1–1 home draw with Bristol City, and admitted the players performed well below their best. Adams returned on crutches for the home encounter with high-flying Peterborough United and tried a new diamond formation in midfield; the tactic brought a good performance out of the side, but a late strike for "Posh" left Vale with a 1–0 defeat. The next game was against Sheffield United at Bramall Lane, and Adams was again disappointed at his boyhood club as Vale were beaten 2–1, with Daniel Jones sent off for two yellow cards after just 20 minutes. After the match Adams showed concern over the lack of club discipline on display as Myrie-Williams publicly argued with Adams after being substituted and Pope and Robertson had a heated discussion on the pitch. He had no complaints though when Vale came back from Crawley Town with a 3–0 victory; Jordan Hugill, fresh from a loan spell with Gateshead, made an impressive debut up front with Ben Williamson. The same eleven players started the following game at home to Gillingham, and came from 1–0 down at half-time to win 2–1 after the introduction of Tom Pope.

A tricky fixture away at Swindon Town opened the month of November, and Vale came from 3–0 down to make it 3–2 before they collapsed again and left the field on the wrong end of a 5–2 beating; this was the third game in a row at County Ground where Vale conceded at least five goals. Having failed to hold down a first team place, especially with the tactical move away from wingers, Kaid Mohamed joined former club AFC Wimbledon on loan. They returned to form though in Burslem, recording a 3–1 victory over nearby Shrewsbury Town, and Adams said that the club had "unearthed a gem" after Hugill added Vale's third goal. The first big derby game against Crewe Alexandra came the following week, and the "Railwaymen" took the lead after 35 minutes only for Rob Taylor to mark his first appearance of the season by scoring the equalizing goal; Myrie-Williams scored the winning goal on 83 minutes which put Vale within one point of the play-offs whilst keeping Crewe second from bottom. However Vale fans were disappointed to see Preston North End win 2–0 at Vale Park despite playing with only ten men from the 12th minute of the game; it later transpired that the referee had sent off the wrong man, and that Neil Kilkenny was dismissed for striking Anthony Griffith when in fact the culprit was eventual double goalscorer Joe Garner. On 29 November goalkeeper Chris Neal injured his wrist and 21-year-old back-up 'keeper Sam Johnson was handed his league debut the following day away at Walsall. Johnson impressed and managed to keep a clean sheet as the "Valiants" recorded their first win at Walsall in 66 years.

Vale were heading for an eighth win in ten games when they took the lead at home to Stevenage on 14 December, but they conceded two goals in two minutes just before half-time and had to rely on a last minute Tom Pope head to salvage a point. After the match Tom Pope bemoaned Stevenage's negative tactics. Vale then went down 3–0 at Milton Keynes Dons, with Adams describing the team as looking "like that last turkey on the shelf on Christmas Eve". They returned to winning ways with a 2–1 home victory over struggling Notts County, both Myre-Williams' and Tomlin's goals coming from the penalty spot. Vale ended the year just one place and two points outside the play-offs by beating sixth place Rotherham United 2–0 in a physical battle at Vale Park.

Vale opened 2014 with a difficult fixture away at fourth-placed Preston North End, and were beaten 3–2 despite staging a late comeback when they went 3–0 down. Lee Hughes was allowed to join Forest Green Rovers on a free transfer after the 37-year-old stated that he wanted to play as much first team football as possible before his retirement. On 7 January, Adams signed 19-year-old defender Jack Grimmer on loan from Premier League side Fulham; he stated "We have a lot of experienced defenders making mistakes and we have been looking to strengthen in that area for a while." He made his debut against Brentford four days later alongside Joe Davis, who was also making his first appearance of the season following a loan spell with Luton Town, and the young pair impressed despite Vale losing 2–0 to the league leaders. Adams further strengthened the team by signing Belgian midfielder Florent Cuvelier on loan from Sheffield United. However Cuvelier was ruled out for the rest of the season after tearing his anterior cruciate ligament just 36 minutes into his debut – a 1–0 home win over Oldham, the only goal of the game being scored by Grimmer. Another midfielder, Billy Knott, was then signed on loan from Premier League side Sunderland.

Vale opened February by losing 3–2 to Gillingham, with 16 stone forward Adebayo Akinfenwa proving to be a thorn in the club's side again as he grabbed two of the goals. Micky Adams apologized to the fans for the performance. Vale then blew a 2–0 half-time lead over Swindon to lose the game 3–2 – the third game in a row where they conceded three goals. Following this Adams decided to change his tactics to a more defensive approach. Vale then had the chance to close the gap on the play-offs with a mid-week tie at home to Colchester, and a brace from Doug Loft took them 2–0 up shortly after half-time, a lead which young centre-backs Davis and Grimmer managed to defend without too many worrying moments. Another clean sheet followed with the same defensive partnership, though Vale failed to break down a determined Shrewsbury defence in blustery conditions. A trip to Valley Parade followed, and Bradford stole all three points with a stoppage time goal. The "A500 derby" followed, and a negative Vale line-up allowed Crewe the opening goal on 15 minutes; despite Adams making a double substitution on 32 minutes Vale were second best for the rest of the game and went on to lose 3–1.

March opened with a 3–0 defeat to Wolves at Molineux, who claimed their seventh successive victory to climb to the top of the table. Vale seemed to be heading for a fourth successive defeat after going 1–0 down at home to Carlisle, but they turned the game around in the second half to turn out 2–1 winners. Second-placed Leyton Orient came away from Vale Park with a 2–0 win, Vale's good performance went unrewarded as they had two goals disallowed by the referee. Vale then travelled to Northampton to face Coventry, and looked to be heading home with the three points after leading 2–0 with ten minutes to go only to forced to settle for a point after a stoppage time equalizer. They built a three-goal lead in the next game, at home to Tranmere Rovers, and again conceded two goals but retained the lead to win the game 3–2. Vale were well beaten at Bristol City, the 5–0 thumping being their worst result of the campaign. After the match Adams took his players to acknowledge the club's travelling support only to end up in an ugly confrontation with a small number of fans. He made six changes for the next match away at Stevenage, which ended in a 1–1 draw after a highly physical encounter.

April began with a 2–1 win over Crawley, the only negative in the game being a red card for Chris Robertson, who seemed baffled as to why he was dismissed. His ban was later overturned and handed to Chris Lines, who had committed the tackle from behind which started the brawl in which Robertson had attempted to intervene as peacemaker. Vale went on to beat Walsall 1–0 with a controversial penalty and in doing so recorded their first double over Walsall in 114 years. Captain Loft and Dan Jones were ruled out of the Vale's next fixture after a training ground confrontation between the pair left Loft with a facial injury. Following a short investigation Jones was sacked by the club. This upheaval seemed not to affect the team as they went 2–0 up over Notts County at Meadow Lane, but then four goals without reply from County all but ended Vale's faint hopes of a play-off push. Vale then recorded their fourth straight home win after Jordan Hugill scored the only goal of the game against Milton Keynes Dons. A trip to third-place Rotherham ended with a 1–0 defeat, despite the hosts going down to ten men. In their final home game of the season, Vale let slip a one-goal lead to lose 2–1 to Sheffield United. The season ended with a 0–0 draw with Peterborough United at London Road. Three players were released in the summer: Anthony Griffith, Liam Chilvers and Rob Taylor, whilst Chris Shuker announced his retirement due to a chronic knee injury. Micky Adams elected to sign a new contract with the club, as did most of the club's out-of-contract players. However a big blow to the club was the departure of Doug Loft, who joined hometown club Gillingham. Another big name to leave the club was Jennison Myrie-Williams, who signed with Scunthorpe United. Promising forward Jordan Hugill also rejected a contract, and instead signed with Preston North End. Meanwhile, Gavin Tomlin was sold to Crawley Town for a small fee, after deciding to relocate back to London after failing to settle in the Midlands. The final departure was young defender Joe Davis, who left to join the Leicester City Academy.

Finances & ownership issues
The trade union GMB sponsored the club's kits, as well as Vale Park's Bycars Stand. The budget set in pre-season required an average home attendance of 7,900 in order to break even.

Just as the club seemed to have found stable leadership and steady progress on the pitch, in October chairman Norman Smurthwaite controversially banned local newspaper The Sentinel from all press events after taking objection with the newspaper's reporting a lengthy delay in producing specially presented third-kit shirts to fans who had pre-paid for the items in May. Smurthwaite responded by stating that the newspaper had been banned for contacting him personally for comment on the story rather than the club's media team, and that he was also frustrated with a Sentinel reporter for attempting to report facts which Smurthwaite had disclosed to the journalist "in confidence".

More worry came in December, when The Sunday People revealed that Smurthwaite had e-mailed agents pleading poverty over the club's finances. He later issued a statement saying that the wage bill budget set by the club in the summer was over-ambitious and that he had been forced to meet the £1 million budget deficit out of his own pocket.

The concern in January was over the future of manager Micky Adams, and the apparent reluctance of Smurthwaite to offer a contract despite the positive results on the field as the manager's contract came close to its expiry at the end of the season; once a contract was promised Adams stated that "He has talked about it, now he has to deliver. I have never expressed a desire to leave. If everything is right I don't see there being a problem, but once again Norman is talking about things instead of doing things."

Cup competitions
Vale faced a kind draw in the First Round of the FA Cup, as their opponents were Southern League Division One South & West outfit Shortwood United, an amateur side five leagues below League One who had never before qualified for the First Round of the competition. The game was broadcast live on BT Sport, earning the club £67,500 in television money. Vale avoided an upset and recorded a 4–0 win. They then disposed of Conference Premier outfit Salisbury City with a 4–1 win, though the game had been level at 1–1 with less than 15 minutes to go. In the Third Round were League Two side Plymouth Argyle, and Vale seemed to be on their way through to the Fourth Round after first half goals from Gavin Tomlin and Tom Pope, but failed to make the most of their advantage and instead were forced to go to a replay after conceding two goals in the second half. Manager Micky Adams was angry with his team's performance, particularly the defending. Vale twice came from behind in the replay and went on to win 3–2 and survived having Chris Lines sent off for a foul in the box as Chris Neal saved the resulting penalty. The Fourth Round would be where Vale's adventure ended, as Championship club Brighton & Hove Albion put in a professional performance at Vale Park and left with a 3–1 victory.

Vale faced League One rivals Walsall at home in the First Round of the League Cup. The club's abysmal record in the competition continued with a bitter 2–1 defeat – James Baxendale's winning goal coming seconds after Vale had a strong penalty appeal waved away.

The team made progress in the Football League Trophy, advancing past League Two side Bury after Tom Pope rescued the game with two goals in the last ten minutes. However a disappointing performance against Rochdale saw them exit at the Second Round with a 1–0 loss.

Results

Pre-season

Football League One

League table

Results by matchday

Matches

FA Cup

League Cup

League Trophy

Squad statistics

Appearances and goals

Top scorers

Disciplinary record

Sourced from Soccerway.

Awards

Transfers

Transfers in

Transfers out

Loans in

Loans out

References
Specific

General
Soccerbase

Port Vale F.C. seasons
Port Vale